The County of Rodney is one of the 37 counties of Victoria which are part of the cadastral divisions of Australia, used for land titles.  It is located between the Goulburn River in the east, and the Campaspe River in the west, with a small part of the Murray River to the north. Puckapunyal is near its southern edge. The former electoral district of Rodney was in a similar area.

Parishes 
Parishes include:
 Bailieston, Victoria
 Bonn, Victoria
 Burnewang, Victoria
 Burramboot, Victoria
 Burramboot East, Victoria
 Campaspe, Victoria
 Carag Carag, Victoria
 Cherrington, Victoria
 Colbinabbin, Victoria
 Coomboona, Victoria
 Cornella, Victoria
 Corop, Victoria
 Crosbie, Victoria
 Dargile, Victoria
 Echuca North, Victoria
 Echuca South, Victoria
 Girgarre, Victoria
 Girgarre East, Victoria
 Gobarup, Victoria
 Kanyapella, Victoria
 Koyuga, Victoria
 Kyabram, Victoria
 Kyabram East, Victoria
 Moora, Victoria
 Mooroopna, Victoria
 Mooroopna West, Victoria
 Murchison, Victoria
 Murchison North, Victoria
 Muskerry, Victoria
 Nanneella, Victoria
 Noorilim, Victoria
 Redcastle, Victoria
 Rochester, Victoria
 Runnymede, Victoria
 Taripta, Victoria
 Timmering, Victoria
 Tongala, Victoria
 Toolamba, Victoria
 Toolamba West, Victoria
 Toolleen, Victoria
 Undera, Victoria
 Wanalta, Victoria
 Waranga, Victoria
 Weston, Victoria
 Whroo, Victoria
 Wirrate, Victoria
 Wyuna, Victoria

References
Vicnames, place name details
Research aids, Victoria 1910
Cadastral map of the county of Rodney in Victoria showing parish and county boundaries and topographical features in explored areas. 1866, F.F. Bailliere. National Library of Australia

Counties of Victoria (Australia)